Trésorine Nzuzi Vumongo (born 11 October 1988) is a DR Congolese footballer who plays as a forward. She has been a member of the DR Congo women's national team.

Club career
Nzuzi has played for La Source in the Republic of the Congo and for Force Terrestre in the Democratic Republic of the Congo.

International career
Nzuzi was capped for the DR Congo at senior level during the 2006 African Women's Championship.

International goals
Scores and results list DR Congo's goal tally first

See also
 List of Democratic Republic of the Congo women's international footballers

References

1988 births
Living people
Democratic Republic of the Congo women's footballers
Women's association football forwards
Democratic Republic of the Congo women's international footballers
Democratic Republic of the Congo expatriate footballers
Democratic Republic of the Congo expatriate sportspeople in the Republic of the Congo
Expatriate footballers in the Republic of the Congo